This is a list of rivers in the U.S. state of Illinois:

By drainage basin

Gulf of Mexico
Mississippi River
Ohio River
Lusk Creek
Saline River
Wabash River
Little Wabash River
Skillet Fork
Elm River
Fox River
Salt Creek
Bonpas Creek
Embarras River (Illinois)
North Fork Embarras River
Little Embarras River
Little Vermilion River
Vermilion River
Middle Fork Vermilion River
Salt Fork Vermilion River
Saline Branch
Boneyard Creek
Cache River
Cypress Creek
Big Muddy River
Beaucoup Creek
Little Muddy River
Casey Creek (Casey Fork)
Marys River
Little Marys River
Kaskaskia River
Shoal Creek
West Okaw River
Palmer Creek
Wood River
Illinois River
Macoupin Creek
Big Sandy Creek
La Moine River
Sangamon River
Salt Creek
Spring Creek
Sugar Creek
Lick Creek
Spoon River
Mackinaw River
Little Mackinaw River
Panther Creek
Red River
Big Bureau Creek
Little Vermilion River
Vermilion River
Rooks Creek
Fox River
Indian Creek
Somonauk Creek
Mazon River
Des Plaines River
DuPage River
Salt Creek
Addison Creek
Buffalo Creek
Hickory Creek
Kankakee River
Rock Creek
Iroquois River
Henderson Creek
Edwards River
Rock River
Green River
Pine Creek
Kyte River
Leaf River
Stillman Creek
Kishwaukee River
Killbuck Creek
South Branch Kishwaukee River
Owens Creek
East Branch South Branch Kishwaukee River
Beaver Creek
Piscasaw Creek
Mokeler Creek
Coon Creek
Rush Creek
North Branch Kishwaukee River
Pecatonica River
Sugar River
Yellow Creek
Plum River
Apple River
Galena River
Sinsinawa River
Little Menominee River
Menominee River

Gulf of St. Lawrence
Lake Michigan
Waukegan River
Chicago River
North Branch Chicago River
Skokie River
South Branch Chicago River
Bubbly Creek or South Fork South Branch Chicago River
Calumet River
Grand Calumet River
Little Calumet River
Midlothian Creek
Thorn Creek
Butterfield Creek

Alphabetically
Addison Creek
Apple River
Beaucoup Creek
Beaver Creek
Big Bureau Creek
Big Muddy River
Boneyard Creek
Bonpas Creek
Bubbly Creek
Buffalo Creek
Butterfield Creek
Cache River
Calumet River
Casey Creek, also known as Casey Fork
Chicago River
Coon Creek
Cypress Creek
Des Plaines River
DuPage River
East Branch South Branch Kishwaukee River
Edwards River
Elm River
Embarras River (Illinois)
Fox River (Illinois River tributary), northern Illinois
Fox River (Little Wabash tributary), southern Illinois
Galena River
Grand Calumet River
Green River
Henderson Creek
Hickory Creek
Illinois River
Indian Creek
Iroquois River
Jackson Creek
Kankakee River
Kaskaskia River
Killbuck Creek
Kishwaukee River
Kyte River
La Moine River
Leaf River
Lick Creek
Little Calumet River
Little Embarras River
Little Mackinaw River
Little Marys River
Little Menominee River
Little Muddy River
Little Vermilion River (Illinois River tributary)
Little Vermilion River (Wabash River tributary)
Little Wabash River
Lusk Creek
Mackinaw River
Macoupin Creek
Marys River
Mazon River
Menominee River
Middle Fork Vermilion River
Mississippi River
Mokeler Creek
North Branch Chicago River
North Branch Kishwaukee River
North Fork Embarras River
Ohio River
Owens Creek
Palmer Creek (Columbia, IL)
Panther Creek (Mackinaw watershed)
Pecatonica River
Pine Creek
Piscasaw Creek
Plum River
Red River
Rock Creek
Rock River
Rush Creek
Saline Branch
Saline River
Salt Creek (Des Plaines River tributary)
Salt Creek (Little Wabash River tributary)
Salt Creek (Sangamon River tributary)
Salt Fork Vermilion River
Sangamon River
Shoal Creek
Sinsinawa River
Skillet Fork
Skokie River
Somonauk Creek
South Branch Chicago River
South Branch Kishwaukee River
Spoon River
Stillman Creek
Sugar Creek
Sugar River
Thorn Creek
Tyler Creek, (not to be confused with a creek of the same in Oregon)
Vermilion River (Illinois River tributary)
Vermilion River (Wabash River tributary)
Wabash River
West Okaw River
Wood River
Yellow Creek

See also
List of rivers in the United States
Chicago Sanitary and Ship Canal
Hennepin Canal Parkway State Park
Illinois and Michigan Canal
Watersheds of Illinois

Illinois rivers
 
Rivers